Jeffrey Matthew Duncan (born December 9, 1978) is an American baseball coach and former Major League Baseball outfielder for the New York Mets. He is the head baseball coach at Kent State University. Duncan played college baseball at Iowa State University in 1998 before transferring to Arizona State University from 1999 to 2000 to play for coach Pat Murphy. After a standout college career, he would be drafted in the 7th round in 2000 by the New York Mets. Duncan also played in the San Diego Padres, Los Angeles Dodgers, and Toronto Blue-Jays organizations. He hit and threw left-handed.

Amateur career
Duncan graduated from Lemont High School where he played baseball. He was chosen by the Chicago Cubs in the 41st round of the  Major League Baseball Draft, but chose to attend Iowa State University instead. A year later, he transferred to Arizona State University. In 1999, he played collegiate summer baseball in the Cape Cod Baseball League for the Yarmouth-Dennis Red Sox, and was named a league all-star.

Professional career
He was drafted by the Mets in the 7th round of the  draft, and agreed to a contract. He had few RBI in the two seasons, but registered 61 stolen bases.

In 2003, Duncan hit well at Double-A Binghamton. Duncan was called up to the majors and made his debut on May 20, 2003. After three games and one start, Duncan was back in Binghamton until mid-July.  When he returned to the majors, he collected 12 hits in 11 games and his average stood at .400.  This turned out to be the lone good hitting streak of his career. In August 2003, he hit .106 with no RBI and spent a short time with the Triple-A Norfolk Tides. His .200 average in September was punctuated by the only three-hit game of his career.

Duncan was back in the majors with the Mets in 2004, but after only one hit in 15 at bats through May 5, Duncan was back in the minors. He hit under .260 at both the Double-A and Triple-A levels of the Mets' system and was not brought back to the majors. In , he hit only .245 with the Double-A Binghamton Mets and was released on August 11. Duncan was soon signed as a free agent by the San Diego Padres. Although he hit .300 for Double-A Mobile, San Diego did not re-sign him after the season. In , Duncan hit .299 with the Los Angeles Dodgers' Triple-A Las Vegas 51s. He signed a minor league contract with the Toronto Blue Jays on November 10, 2006, but after a strong and impressive spring training he was sent down to AAA Syracuse.  After an injury plagued season, he was released on July 3, .

After his release, he signed with the Somerset Patriots of the Atlantic League, but asked for his release on May 21, ; he immediately retired.

Coaching career
In September 2009, Duncan left his volunteer position with the Auburn Tigers for a full-time assistant coaching position with the Purdue Boilermakers, which he held through the end of the 2013 season. Prior to the start of the 2014 season, Duncan was hired as the head coach at Kent State.

Head coaching record
Below is a table of Duncan's yearly records as an NCAA head baseball coach.

References

External links

1978 births
Living people
Baseball coaches from Illinois
Auburn Tigers baseball coaches
Purdue Boilermakers baseball coaches
Kent State Golden Flashes baseball coaches
New York Mets players
Major League Baseball outfielders
Baseball players from Chicago
Arizona State Sun Devils baseball players
Iowa State Cyclones baseball players
People from Harvey, Illinois
Pittsfield Mets players
Capital City Bombers players
St. Lucie Mets players
Norfolk Tides players
Mobile BayBears players
Las Vegas 51s players
Binghamton Mets players
Syracuse Chiefs players
Somerset Patriots players
Yarmouth–Dennis Red Sox players
Waterloo Bucks players